Gataparsen (development code LY2181308) is an antisense oligonucleotide that complementarily binds to survivin mRNA and inhibits its expression in tumor tissue.

It being investigated for a number of different cancers.

It is targeted at survivin which prevents cells dying.

Clinical trials 
It has completed a phase II trial for acute myeloid leukemia.

A phase II trial for non-small cell lung cancer has started.

A phase II trial for hormone-refractory prostate cancer will run until early 2012.

References 

Antisense RNA
Nucleic acids